Dubrovo is a rural locality (a village) in Kubenskoye Rural Settlement, Vologodsky District, Vologda Oblast, Russia. The population was 6 as of 2002.

Geography 
The distance to Vologda is 61 km, to Kubenskoye is 23 km. Kosyakovo, Odoleikha, Malonovlenskoye, Isakovo, Nizhneye, Maryino are the nearest rural localities.

References 

Rural localities in Vologodsky District